Coiled-coil domain-containing protein 50 is a protein that in humans is encoded by the CCDC50 gene.

References

External links

Further reading